Legionella lansingensis is a Gram-negative, catalase- and oxidase-positive bacterium from the genus Legionella with a single polar flagellum which was isolated from a patient with pneumonia through bronchoscopy.

References

External links
Type strain of Legionella lansingensis at BacDive -  the Bacterial Diversity Metadatabase

Legionellales
Bacteria described in 1994